Al-Mithaq Sport Club, is an Iraqi football team based in Baghdad, that plays in the Iraq Division Three.

History
Al-Mithaq Club was founded in 1972 in Sadr City, Baghdad, which is the oldest club in terms of establishment in Sadr City.

Managerial history
 Basil Mohammed 
 Haider Abdul-Hassan

References

External links
 Al-Mithaq SC on Goalzz.com
 Iraq Clubs- Foundation Dates

1972 establishments in Iraq
Association football clubs established in 1972
Football clubs in Baghdad